Oceano (Spanish: Océano, meaning "Ocean") is a census-designated place (CDP) in San Luis Obispo County, California, United States. The population was 7,286 at the 2010 census, up from 7,260 at the 2000 census.

Geography

Oceano is located at  (35.102680, -120.611471).

Oceano is part of the 5 Cities Metropolitan Area.

Oceano's beach is the Oceano Dunes State Vehicular Recreation Area, a  coastal sand dune. As the only state park in California where visitors may drive vehicles on the beach, tourists are attracted from all over the United States. Activities on this beach include riding the sand dunes on all-terrain-vehicles, swimming, clamming, camping, surfing, surf fishing, hiking, and bird watching.

Demographics

2010
At the 2010 census Oceano had a population of 7,286. The ethnic makeup of Oceano was 5,105 (70.1%) White, 62 (0.9%) African American, 120 (1.6%) Native American, 165 (2.3%) Asian, 7 (0.1%) Pacific Islander, 1,509 (20.7%) from other races, and 318 (4.4%) from two or more races. Hispanic or Latino of any race were 3,484 persons (47.8%).

The whole population lived in households, no one lived in non-institutionalized group quarters and no one was institutionalized.

There were 2,603 households, 904 (34.7%) had children under the age of 18 living in them, 1,147 (44.1%) were opposite-sex married couples living together, 360 (13.8%) had a female householder with no husband present, 197 (7.6%) had a male householder with no wife present.  There were 197 (7.6%) unmarried opposite-sex partnerships, and 38 (1.5%) same-sex married couples or partnerships. 680 households (26.1%) were one person and 266 (10.2%) had someone living alone who was 65 or older. The average household size was 2.80.  There were 1,704 families (65.5% of households); the average family size was 3.39.

The population was spread out, with 1,738 people (23.9%) under the age of 18, 747 people (10.3%) aged 18 to 24, 2,028 people (27.8%) aged 25 to 44, 1,870 people (25.7%) aged 45 to 64, and 903 people (12.4%) who were 65 or older.  The median age was 35.4 years. For every 100 females, there were 101.9 males.  For every 100 females age 18 and over, there were 100.7 males.

There were 3,117 housing units at an average density of 2,015.1 per square mile, of the occupied units 1,355 (52.1%) were owner-occupied and 1,248 (47.9%) were rented. The homeowner vacancy rate was 3.7%; the rental vacancy rate was 5.9%.  3,444 people (47.3% of the population) lived in owner-occupied housing units and 3,842 people (52.7%) lived in rental housing units.

2000
At the 2000 census there were 7,260 people, 2,447 households, and 1,722 families in the CDP. The racial makeup of the CDP was 68.73% White, 1.12% African American, 1.29% Native American, 1.80% Asian, 0.03% Pacific Islander, 21.78% from other races, and 5.25% from two or more races. Hispanic or Latino of any race were 44.63%.

Of the 2,447 households, 38.8% had children under the age of 18 living with them, 50.2% were married couples living together, 14.8% had a female householder with no husband present, and 29.6% were non-families. 23.0% of households were one person, and 9.2% were one person aged 65 or older.  The average household size was 2.96 and the average family size was 3.50.

The age distribution was 29.5% under the age of 18, 10.2% from 18 to 24, 29.8% from 25 to 44, 20.1% from 45 to 64, and 10.4% 65 or older.  The median age was 32 years. For every 100 females, there were 97.2 males.  For every 100 females age 18 and over, there were 96.3 males.

The median household income was $38,014 and the median family income was $39,254. Males had a median income of $28,180 versus $21,310 for females. The per capita income for the CDP was $16,561.  About 14.1% of families and 16.3% of the population were below the poverty line, including 22.0% of those under age 18 and 6.2% of those age 65 or over.

History

The environs of Oceano were the home of "Halcyon," a utopian religious community established in 1903 by the theosophical Temple of the People, based in Syracuse, New York. The group, which believed in channeling unseen electromagnetic forces in an effort to attain human perfection, constructed a number of buildings in association with their colonizing effort, including the Blue Star Memorial Temple and the Halcyon Hotel and Sanatorium.

In 1948, Oceano, was the site of the founding by Catherine Nimmo (a registered nurse and Doctor of Chiropractic who had recently moved there from the Netherlands) and Rubin Abramowitz (an engineer) of the U.S. Vegan Society, the first vegan society in the United States. The Society lasted from 1948–1960 and was a predecessor to the American Vegan Society.

Culture
The Great American Melodrama performs original plays nightly in Oceano.
Irish poet and Celtic mythologist Ella Young's final years were spent in Oceano (she died there in 1956).

Government
The Oceano Community Services District provides the following services: fire and emergency, water, wastewater collection, solid waste, parks and recreation, and limited street lighting.

As an unincorporated town in San Luis Obispo County, Oceano is in the Board of Supervisors 4th District.

See also
 Oceano County Airport

Footnotes

Further reading

 Paul Eli Ivey, Radiance from Halcyon: A Utopian Experiment in Religion and Science. Minneapolis, MN: University of Minnesota Press, 2013.

External links

 Oceano Dunes State Vehicle Recreation Area - Dune Guide

 
Populated coastal places in California
Census-designated places in San Luis Obispo County, California
Census-designated places in California